Ageeth is a female given name of Dutch origin. Notable people with the given name include:

Ageeth Boomgaardt (born 1972), Dutch former field hockey defender
Ageeth Scherphuis (1933-2012), Dutch journalist

Dutch feminine given names